Linghang, secondary station name: Dayuan International Senior High School is a station on the Taoyuan Airport MRT located in Dayuan District, Taoyuan City, Taiwan. It opened for commercial service on 2 March 2017.

This elevated station has two island platforms and four tracks, although only two tracks are in commercial use. Only Commuter trains stop at this station. It opened for trial service on 2 February 2017, and for commercial service 2 March 2017.

Construction on the station began on 18 September 2008, and opened for commercial service on 2 March 2017 with the opening of the Taipei-Huanbei section of the Airport MRT.

Layout

Around the Station
Hengshan Calligraphy Art Park (400m southwest of the station)

Taoyuan Sunlight Arena (450m west of the station)

Hengshan Calligraphy Art Center (600m southwest of the station)

Dayuan International Senior High School (700m south of the station)

Exits
Exit 1: Section 4, Linghang North Road

See also
 Taoyuan Metro
 Taoyuan Airport MRT

References

Railway stations opened in 2017
2017 establishments in Taiwan
Taoyuan Airport MRT stations